RUQ or ruq may refer to:

 Megleno-Romanian language (ISO 639-3 language code)
 right upper quadrant of the human abdomen